Worcestershire was a county constituency of the House of Commons of the Parliament of England then of the Parliament of Great Britain from 1707 to 1800 and of the Parliament of the United Kingdom from 1801 to 1832. It was represented until 1832 by two Members of Parliament traditionally referred to as Knights of the Shire. It was split then into two two-member divisions, for Parliamentary purposes, Worcestershire Eastern and Worcestershire Western constituencies.

Boundaries
Worcestershire was one of the historic counties of England. The constituency comprised the whole county, except for the boroughs of Bewdley, Droitwich, Evesham and Worcester.

Members of Parliament

1294–1478

Source: Treadway Russell Nash.

1479–1552

1553–1649

Source: TR Nash

Commonwealth Parliaments

Source: T. R. Nash, Collections for a History of Worcestershire (1783)

MPs 1660–1832

Elections

The county franchise, from 1430, was held by the owners of freehold land valued at 40 shillings or more. Each voter had as many votes as there were seats to be filled. Votes had to be cast by a spoken declaration, in public, at the hustings, which took place in the county town of Worcester. The expense and difficulty of voting at only one location in the county, together with the lack of a secret ballot contributed to the corruption and intimidation of voters, which was widespread in the unreformed British political system.

The expense, to candidates, of contested elections encouraged the leading families of the county to agree on the candidates to be returned unopposed whenever possible. Contested county elections were therefore unusual.

See also

List of former United Kingdom Parliament constituencies
Unreformed House of Commons

References

Parliamentary constituencies in Worcestershire (historic)
Constituencies of the Parliament of the United Kingdom established in 1290
Constituencies of the Parliament of the United Kingdom disestablished in 1832